Amin Wahbi is a Lebanese Shia politician and cardiologist. He was born in 1952. In 2004 he became one of the founding leaders of the Democratic Left Movement. He was elected to parliament in the 2009 Lebanese general election.

References

1952 births
Living people
Democratic Left Movement (Lebanon) politicians
Members of the Parliament of Lebanon
Lebanese Shia Muslims